San Pancrazio Martire  is a Roman Catholic parish church located on Via Cavour #4 in the town of Cappella de' Picenardi in the province of Cremona, region of Lombardy, Italy.

History
In 1080, Annibale Giovanni, descendants of German barons in possession of the territory, built a chapel here dedicated to San Pancrazio. The church appears to have undergone major reconstruction and enlargement, in recent centuries, with interiors refurbished in 18th and 19th centuries.

References

Churches in the province of Cremona